John Sparnon (died 15 November 2014) was a New Zealand rugby league player who represented New Zealand.

Playing career
Sparnon played for the Richmond and Point Chevalier clubs in the Auckland Rugby League. He represented Auckland. In the 1963 trials, Sparnon scored two tries and was subsequently selected to tour Australia with the New Zealand Kiwis, becoming Kiwi number 419. However he did not play in any test matches during the tour.

He was in the Auckland side which beat Australia 15-14 in 1969.

He died on 15 November 2014 in Pattaya, Thailand.

References

New Zealand rugby league players
New Zealand national rugby league team players
Auckland rugby league team players
1940s births
2014 deaths
Rugby league centres
Point Chevalier Pirates players
Richmond Bulldogs players